Prochnow is a surname. Notable people with the surname include:
Christian Prochnow (born 1982), German triathlete
Herbert V. Prochnow (1897–1998), American businessman and writer
Julian Prochnow (born 1986), German footballer
Jürgen Prochnow (born 1941), German-born American actor
Tyler Prochnow (born 1966), American lawyer and sports agent

See also
 

Surnames of Slavic origin